Perevalne ((Perevalnoye)) (until 1945, Angara) is a village in Crimea, a disputed territory recognized by a majority of countries as part of Ukraine but administered by Russia as the Republic of Crimea. The village of Perevalne is administered by the Dobre Village Council, which in turn is subordinate to Crimea's Simferopol Raion (district) authorities.

According to the  2001 Ukrainian census, its population was 3,660. The village is located in the middle of the Crimean Mountains, next to the Chatyr-Dag massif. The Simferopol—Alushta—Yalta highway runs through the village, as well as the Crimean Trolleybus line, which has a stop in the settlement.

There is a garrison (воинская часть A-2320) in Pevevalne. Former Soviet training center for special forces. The Ukrainian 36th separate mechanized coastal infantry brigade was located there and during the 2014 annexation of Crimea by the Russian Federation was surrounded by the Russian troops without military rank insignia or cockade.

References

External links
 

Villages in Crimea
Simferopol Raion
Simferopolsky Uyezd